Desidae is a family of spiders, some of which are known as intertidal spiders. The family is named for the genus Desis, members of which live in a very unusual location — between the tides. The family has been reevaluated in recent years and now includes inland genera and species as well, such as Badumna and Phryganoporus. In 2017, the family Amphinectidae was merged into Desidae. The family Toxopidae has been separated off. Those intertidal spiders that are truly marine commonly live in barnacle shells, which they seal up with silk; this allows them to maintain an air bubble during high tide. They emerge at night to feed on various small arthropods that live in the intertidal zone.

Distribution
As now circumscribed, the family Desidae is mainly found in South America and Australasia, with some species reaching north to Malaysia.

Metaltella simoni has been introduced in a large part of the Southern United States (records exist from California, Louisiana, Mississippi, and Florida) and is considered an invasive species in Florida. It is feared that it could extirpate the native titanoecid species Titanoeca brunnea.

Genera

, the World Spider Catalog accepts the following genera:

Akatorea Forster & Wilton, 1973 — New Zealand
Amphinecta Simon, 1898 — New Zealand
Austmusia Gray, 1983 — Australia
Badumna Thorell, 1890 — Oceania, Asia, North America, Uruguay
Baiami Lehtinen, 1967 — Australia
Bakala Davies, 1990 — Australia
Barahna Davies, 2003 — Australia
Buyina Davies, 1998 — Australia
Calacadia Exline, 1960 — Chile
Cambridgea L. Koch, 1872 — New Zealand
Canala Gray, 1992 — New Caledonia
Cicirra Simon, 1886 — Australia
Colcarteria Gray, 1992 — Australia
Corasoides Butler, 1929 — Papua New Guinea, Australia
Cunnawarra Davies, 1998 — Australia
Desis Walckenaer, 1837 — Africa, Ecuador, Asia, Oceania
Dunstanoides Forster & Wilton, 1989 — New Zealand
Epimecinus Simon, 1908 — Australia
Forsterina Lehtinen, 1967 — Australia
Goyenia Forster, 1970 — New Zealand
Helsonia Forster, 1970 — New Zealand
Holomamoea Forster & Wilton, 1973 — New Zealand
Huara Forster, 1964 — New Zealand
Ischalea L. Koch, 1872 — Madagascar, Mauritius, New Zealand
Jalkaraburra Davies, 1998 — Australia
Keera Davies, 1998 — Australia
Lathyarcha Simon, 1908 — Australia
Magua Davies, 1998 — Australia
Makora Forster & Wilton, 1973 — New Zealand
Mamoea Forster & Wilton, 1973 — New Zealand
Mangareia Forster, 1970 — New Zealand
Maniho Marples, 1959 — New Zealand
Manjala Davies, 1990 — Australia
Matachia Dalmas, 1917 — New Zealand
Mesudus Özdikmen, 2007 — New Zealand
Metaltella Mello-Leitão, 1931 — South America, North America
Namandia Lehtinen, 1967 — Australia
Nanocambridgea Forster & Wilton, 1973 — New Zealand
Neororea Forster & Wilton, 1973 — New Zealand
Notomatachia Forster, 1970 — New Zealand
Nuisiana Forster & Wilton, 1973 — New Zealand
Oparara Forster & Wilton, 1973 — New Zealand
Panoa Forster, 1970 — New Zealand
Paramamoea Forster & Wilton, 1973 — New Zealand
Paramatachia Dalmas, 1918 — Australia
Penaoola Davies, 1998 — Australia
Phryganoporus Simon, 1908 — Australia
Pitonga Davies, 1984 — Northern Australia
Poaka Forster & Wilton, 1973 — New Zealand
Porteria Simon, 1904 — Chile
Quemusia Davies, 1998 — Australia
Rangitata Forster & Wilton, 1973 — New Zealand
Rapua Forster, 1970 — New Zealand
Reinga Forster & Wilton, 1973 — New Zealand
Rorea Forster & Wilton, 1973 — New Zealand
Syrorisa Simon, 1908 — Australia
Tanganoides Davies, 2005 — Australia
Taurongia Hogg, 1901 — Australia
Tuakana Forster, 1970 — New Zealand
Waterea Forster & Wilton, 1973 — New Zealand

See also
 List of Desidae species

References

External links

 

 
Araneomorphae families